Shell Aircraft International, based at Rotterdam The Hague Airport, operates aircraft for Shell plc headquarters and for one Shell group operating company, Shell Oil Company in the United States. It also provides advice on air operations and flight standards to Shell group companies.

Prior to 2000, Shell Aircraft Limited operated corporate jets for Shell group headquarters, and Shell Oil and Shell Canada operated their aircraft independently. In 2000 the three operations were linked in Shell Aircraft International, whose first CEO was Brian Humphries.

On 4 October 2013 the operation of Shell Canada was closed down and all operations were contracted out to Flair Airlines Ltd.

The ICAO telephony designator (Callsign) changed from SHELL to PECTEN in the Edition 201 of the ICAO DOC 8585 Edition 201, published July 2022, however the three-letter designator remained SHE.

Fleet

Shell Aircraft International also works with Brunei Shell Petroleum, the Shell group's Brunei operating company (a 50-50 joint venture with the Brunei Government), which operates 3 × Sikorsky S-92 with 2 × AgustaWestland AW139 Brunei Shell Petroleum is the only Shell operating company to operate its own helicopters: elsewhere, helicopter operations are contracted out to companies such as Bristow Helicopters.

References
FDM – An Operator's Perspective by Stan Medved (Director Corporate Aviation, Shell Aircraft International), at Civil Aviation Authority (United Kingdom) Flight Data Monitoring for Business Jet Operators Conference, 14 November 2012

Companies based in Rotterdam
Aviation in the Netherlands